Hadatha, also El Hadetheh or Hadateh, was a Palestinian Arab village in the District of Tiberias, located 12.5 km southwest of Tiberias. It was depopulated in the 1947–1948 civil war in Mandatory Palestine.

History
Ceramics from the late Roman and Byzantine era have been found.

According to tradition, Hadatha was one of the "Al-Hija" villages named after Emir Hussam al-Din Abu al-Hija. Abu al-Hija ("the Daring") was an Iraqi-born commander of the Kurdish forces that took part in Sultan Saladin's conquest (1187–93) of the Crusader Kingdom. He was renowned for his bravery, and commanded the garrison of Acre at the time of the Siege of Acre (1189–1192).

Abu al-Hija apparently returned to Iraq, but several members of his family remained in the country under orders from Saladin, and these family members settled on large tracts of land that they were given in the Carmel region, in the Lower, Eastern and Western Galilee, and in the Hebron Highlands.  Self-proclaimed kinsmen of al-Hija settled in the villages of Hadatha and Sirin in the Lower Galilee, and Ruweis and Kawkab in the Western Galilee. By tradition the descendants today still claim to be blood relations of al-Hija.

Ottoman era
In 1596, Hadatha was part of the Ottoman Empire,  and the tax register of that year revealed a population of 121. All the villagers were Muslim. A map from Napoleon's invasion of 1799 by Pierre Jacotin  showed the place, named as El Hath.

Victor Guérin, who visited in 1875, noted: "Some of the houses, which are still inhabited, have been constructed of good cut stones taken from some old buildings and mixed with small materials. On the slopes of the hill are found some ten shafts of columns lying scattered about the ground. They are the remains of a monument totally destroyed".

In 1881, the PEF's Survey of Western Palestine (SWP)  described El Hadetheh as: "Stone village, containing 250 Moslems, on cultivated plain, growing barley, etc. No trees or gardens near. Good spring of water and cisterns in the village". They further noted that there was a "Spring on south-east side; good supply of water, perennial; a small stream flowing from it in winter and spring."

A population list from about 1887 showed  el Hadatheh to have  about  1,100  inhabitants;  all Muslims.

British Mandate of Palestine
In the 1922 census of Palestine, conducted by the British Mandate authorities, Hadatheh had a  population of 333, all Muslim, increasing in the 1931 census to 368; 1 Christian, 1 Druze and 366 Muslims, in a total of 75  houses.

1948 and aftermath
According to Morris, the village was abandoned during the 1947–1948 Civil War in Mandatory Palestine on May 12, 1948, under the orders of the Arab Higher Committee. However, Khalidi noted an inconsistency in the account, since the History of Haganah wrote that "the inhabitants fled in fear of the Jews".

In 1992, it was noted that though there were no settlements on village land, the inhabitants of Kefar Qish were cultivating the surrounding lands. A number of Hadatha's dispossessed inhabitants resettled in Tamra, near Acre, during the 1950s.

References

Bibliography

 
  
 

 
 

  

 

 
  (Thomson, 1882,  p. 329)

External links
 Welcome To Hadatha
 Hadatha, Zochrot
Survey of Western Palestine, Map 6: IAA, Wikimedia commons 

Arab villages depopulated during the 1948 Arab–Israeli War
District of Tiberias